25: The Complete Singles is a greatest hits album by Danish soft rock band Michael Learns to Rock, released on 25 October 2014 by MLTR Music. The album is released in commemoration of the band's 25 year anniversary. It includes two new studio recordings, "Silent Times" and "Call on Love". The first single, "Silent Times" was released on 16 September 2014.

Track listing 

Notes
 signifies a vocal producer

Release history

References 

2014 albums
Michael Learns to Rock albums